Daniel Giménez Alcañiz (born 22 June 1984) is a Spanish football coach who is the head coach of  club Akhaa Ahli Aley.

Career

Spain 
Born in Barcelona, Spain, Giménez began his career by coaching youth teams in his native city. He coached in youth categories for CE L'Hospitalet, CE Júpiter, and the FC Barcelona Academy. He then coached the under-19 teams of UE Sants and CB Terlenka. Between 2014 and 2016, he was head coach of CD Alegria in the Quarta Catalana. In 2015, he obtained the UEFA Pro Licence.

Move to Lebanon 
In 2016, Giménez moved to Lebanon, where he was head coach of Salam Zgharta's reserve team Amal Salam Zgharta until 2017, when he became head coach of their under-19 team for one season. He then moved to the Eleven Football Pro academy, before opening his own academy in January 2020: Club Deportivo Beirut.

Ahed 
Giménez joined Ahed's technical staff in 2019, and was also a supervisor of the youth teams. In September 2019, Giménez was appointed technical director, before becoming Bassem Marmar's assistant coach in November. As an assistant coach, he helped Ahed win the 2019 Lebanese Super Cup and the 2019 AFC Cup.

On 28 July 2020, Giménez was announced head coach of the team, following Marmar's move to Al-Arabi in Kuwait. On 28 September, Giménez asked to be relieved of his duties, and returned assistant coach of Ahed.

Nejmeh 
On 23 June 2021, Giménez became assistant coach of Nejmeh, as well as the head coach of their under-20 team. As Nejmeh's coach, Youssef Al Jawhari, left the club mid-season, Giménez coached Nejmeh's league game against Safa on 12 September, in a goalless draw. He helped the U20 team finish first in their group in the 2021–22 season.

Al-Hilal 
On 3 December 2021, Giménez was announced assistant coach of Sudanese club Al-Hilal.

Head coach in Lebanon 
Giménez was appointed head coach of the Lebanon national under-17 team ahead of the 2023 AFC U-17 Asian Cup qualification. On 26 October 2022, he became head coach of Akhaa Ahli Aley in the Lebanese Premier League.

Personal life 
Giménez is married to Cynthia Maalouf, a Lebanese guitarist.

Honours

Assistant coach
Ahed
 AFC Cup: 2019
 Lebanese Super Cup: 2019

Nejmeh
 Lebanese Elite Cup: 2021

Al-Hilal
 Sudan Premier League: 2021–22

References

External links

 
 

1984 births
Living people
Sportspeople from Barcelona
Spanish football managers
Association football coaches
Al Ahed FC managers
Nejmeh SC managers
Akhaa Ahli Aley FC managers
Lebanese Premier League managers
Spanish expatriate football managers
Spanish expatriate sportspeople in Lebanon
Spanish expatriate sportspeople in Sudan
Expatriate football managers in Lebanon
Expatriate football managers in Sudan